The Rogers Lions were a minor league baseball team based in Rogers, Arkansas in 1936 and 1937. Beginning play as the Rogers Rustlers in 1934, and with Rogers using other nicknames (Cardinals, Reds), Rogers teams were members of the Class D level Arkansas State League from 1934 to 1935 and the Arkansas-Missouri League from 1936 to 1938, winning league championships in 1934, 1935 and 1938. Rogers was a minor league affiliate of the St. Louis Cardinals in 1935 and the Cincinnati Reds in 1938. Rogers teams hosted minor league home games at the Athletic Park.

History
In 1934, the Rogers Rustlers began play as members of the four–team Class D level Arkansas State League. The Bentonville Officeholders, Fayetteville Educators and Siloam Springs Buffaloes joined Rogers in beginning league play on May 7, 1934.

In their first season of play, the 1934 Rogers Rustlers won the Arkansas State League championship. The Rustlers ended the Arkansas State League regular season with a record of 36–35, placing 3rd while playing the season under managers Ed Hawk and J.L. Casey. In the playoffs, the Rogers Rustlers beat the Siloam Springs Buffaloes in a one–game playoff for first half title. In the Finals, Rogers defeated the Bentonville Officeholders 4 games to 3 to win the championship.

The Rogers Cardinals played as an affiliate of the St Louis Cardinals in 1935 and defended their Arkansas State League championship. The Cardinals ended the 1935 season with a record of 59–50 losses, placing 2nd in the regular season standings of the four–team league. Fred Cato and Bud Stapleton served as the managers. In the playoff, the Rogers Cardinals defeated the Siloam Springs Travelers 4 games to 3 to win their second consecutive championship.

In 1936, the Arkansas State League evolved to become the Class D level Arkansas-Missouri League, expanding to six teams. No longer a St. Louis Cardinals affiliate, Rogers continued play as the Rogers Lions. The Bentonville Mustangs, Cassville Blues, Fayetteville Bears, Monett Red Birds and Siloam Springs Travelers joined Rogers as charter members of the Arkansas-Missouri League. Rogers finished last in the regular season standings and did not qualify for the playoffs. With a regular season record of 44–75, the Lions place 6th, playing the season under managers Doc Ledbetter and Bud Stapleton. Rogers was 30.5 games behind 1st place Silom Springs.

The 1937 Rogers Lions continued Arkansas–Missouri League play and won both the regular season pennant and playoff championship. The Lions ended the 1937 season with a record of 79–48, winning the pennant by 8.5 games over the 2nd place Fayetteville Angels. Ted Mayer served as manager. In the 1st round playoffs, the Rogers Lions defeated the Neosho Night Hawks 3 games 1 to advance. Rogers defeated the Fayetteville Angels 4 games to 1 in the finals to give the franchise a third championship.

In their final season, Rogers became an affiliate of the Cincinnati Reds in 1938, advancing to the Arkansas–Missouri League playoffs. The Rogers Reds ended the regular season with a record of 63–54, placing 4th in the standings. Pat Patterson served as manager. In the Playoffs, the Neosho Yankees swept Rogers in 3 games, which proved to be the final games for the Rogers franchise.

In 1939, Rogers did not return to league play, as the Arkansas–Missouri League reduced franchises and played the season as a four–team league.

Rogers, Arkansas has not hosted another minor league franchise.

The ballpark
The Rogers minor league teams hosted home games at Athletic Park.

Timeline

Year–by–year records

Notable alumni

Marv Breuer (1934)
Bill Burich (1937)
Walker Cooper (1935) 8x MLB All–Star
Al Gerheauser (1935–1936)
Ed Hawk (1934, MGR)
Eddie Kearse (1936)
Mickey Owen (1934) 4x MLB All–Star
Jerry Priddy (1937)
Hale Swanson (1938)
Hal Toenes (1938)

See also
Rogers Lions playersRogers Cardinals playersRogers Reds playersRogers Rustlers players

References

External links
 Rogers - Baseball Reference

Defunct minor league baseball teams
Rogers, Arkansas
Defunct Arkansas State League teams
Defunct Arkansas-Missouri League teams
Defunct baseball teams in Arkansas
Professional baseball teams in Arkansas
Baseball teams disestablished in 1937
Baseball teams established in 1936
1936 establishments in Arkansas